John Robert Eichel (born October 28, 1996) is an American professional ice hockey center for the Vegas Golden Knights of the National Hockey League (NHL). Eichel was selected second overall in the 2015 NHL Entry Draft by the Buffalo Sabres. Before entering the league, Eichel was described at the age of 17 as "the new face of American hockey," and he was considered a member of a rising class of generational talents in the sport.

Eichel was the recipient of the 2015 Hobey Baker Award, given to the top National Collegiate Athletic Association men's ice hockey player. He was the second freshman to win the award, the other being Paul Kariya in 1993.

Playing career

Amateur
Eichel was born in Chelmsford, MA and grew up in North Chelmsford, Massachusetts. He played for the USA Hockey National Team Development Program team during the 2012–13 and 2013–14 seasons, and was recognized for his outstanding play during the 2013–14 season when he was named to the United States Hockey League Second All-Star Team. After his second season within the Development Program, Eichel signed a letter of intent to commit to Boston University of the Hockey East on April 29, 2014.

On April 10, 2015, Eichel became the second freshman to win the Hobey Baker Award, which was previously won by Paul Kariya in 1993. In 40 games with Boston University, Eichel led the nation in scoring with 26 goals, 45 assists, and 71 points. Eichel was also the Hockey East scoring champion, Player of the Year, Rookie of the Year, First Team Hockey East and a member of the All-Rookie Team, and was named MVP of the conference tournament. Eichel was projected to be the second overall selection in the 2015 NHL Entry Draft behind projected first overall pick Connor McDavid.

Professional

Buffalo Sabres
On June 26, 2015, Eichel was selected second overall by the Buffalo Sabres in the 2015 NHL Entry Draft, one pick after the Edmonton Oilers selected Connor McDavid. In the months leading up to the draft, considerable interest and hype arose surrounding Eichel and McDavid, both seen as generational talents. For example, the sports section of the Buffalo News regularly published the "McEichel Derby," a graphic of the teams at the bottom of the standings. On July 1, 2015, Eichel signed a three-year entry-level contract with the Sabres.

On August 13, 2015, Eichel signed a sponsorship deal with Bauer Hockey, which states Eichel will wear its equipment exclusively and Bauer will provide him with its apparel.

Eichel scored his first NHL goal on October 8, 2015, becoming the youngest player in Sabres history to do so, in his first game in the NHL against the Ottawa Senators. He finished his rookie campaign with 24 goals and 56 points in 81 games, being the Sabres' top goalscorer and second in points (after Ryan O'Reilly) and second in both criteria among rookies, after Artemi Panarin. On October 12, 2016, Eichel suffered a severe high ankle sprain to his left ankle in practice and had to be helped off of the ice; he missed the first two months of the season before making his season debut on November 29. He finished the year with 24 goals and 33 assists in just 61 games.

Before the 2017–18 season, on October 3, 2017, the Sabres signed Eichel to an eight-year, $80 million contract extension worth $10 million annually which began at the start of the 2018–19 season. On December 15, 2017, Eichel scored his first career hat trick against the Carolina Hurricanes in a 5–4 loss. On January 11, 2018, Eichel was selected as the sole representative of the Sabres for the 2018 NHL All-Star game. This was the first NHL All-Star game of Eichel's career. During a game in February against the Boston Bruins, Eichel sprained his ankle and was ruled out for 4–6 weeks. He returned 15 games later to help the Sabres beat the Chicago Blackhawks for the first time since 2009. Eichel finished the 2017–18 season with 25 goals and 39 assists for a total of 64 points in only 67 games.

During the summer before the 2018–19 season, Eichel changed his jersey number from 15 to 9, the same number he wore at Boston University. On October 3, 2018, before the beginning of the regular season, Eichel was named the captain of the Sabres. On March 10, 2019, Eichel was suspended for two games for illegally checking Colorado Avalanche player Carl Söderberg in the head. On March 28, 2019, Eichel scored his 100th career goal in a 5–4 overtime loss to the Detroit Red Wings.

On November 16, 2019, Eichel scored four goals in a 4–2 win over the Ottawa Senators. He was the seventh Sabres player to record four goals in one game and first since Thomas Vanek did it on April 10, 2010. On December 7, Eichel recorded two assists to reach 300 career points in a 6–5 overtime loss to the Vancouver Canucks. On January 2, 2020, Eichel became the first player in Sabres history to score a penalty shot goal in overtime, and also set a franchise record for goals scored in overtime, as the Sabres won 3–2 against the Edmonton Oilers. On February 1, Eichel scored the eighth overtime goal of his career in a 2–1 win over the Columbus Blue Jackets, improving the previous franchise record for most regular-season overtime goals.

On April 14, 2021, it was announced that Eichel would miss the remainder of the 2020–21 season to recover from surgery to repair a spinal disc herniation. In May, Eichel, along with Sam Reinhart, expressed their frustration with the Sabres. He stated, "I have a lot of thinking to do in this offseason... there's a lot I have to consider."

Eichel's relationship with the Sabres failed to improve, and on September 23, 2021, Eichel was stripped of the team captaincy as a result of failing his physical and being placed on long-term injured reserve.

Vegas Golden Knights
On November 4, 2021, Eichel was traded, along with a third-round draft pick, to the Vegas Golden Knights in exchange for Alex Tuch, Peyton Krebs, and first-round and second-round draft picks. His new team allowed Eichel to undergo his preferred surgery, and following recovery he began training with the team. He made his debut with the Golden Knights on February 16, 2022, a 2–0 loss to the Colorado Avalanche. This was Eichel's first NHL game in almost a year, and he remarked that "I was having a pretty fun time out there," adding that he expected returning to competition would be a process. He scored his first goal with the Golden Knights on February 20, a 4–1 victory over the San Jose Sharks, notching an assist as well in the game. On March 10, he made his first appearance with the Golden Knights in Buffalo, where he was greeted with consistent booing from the crowd, notably when Tuch, who had been part of the trade, stripped the puck from him and scored to complete the Sabres' 3–1 victory. Eichel remarked, "This is about the loudest I've heard this place ever. Really. After it took seven years, and me leaving for them to get into the game." Eichel would ultimately finish the season with twelve goals and ten assists in 33 games, generally deemed a successful return, but the Golden Knights struggled with injuries to numerous core players and ultimately missed the playoffs for the first time in franchise history. This turn of events would also be greeted with jeers among many Sabres fans.

The 2022–23 season would begin on a much better note for the Golden Knights, with new coach Bruce Cassidy's arrival shifting the team's playing style and calling on Eichel to assume heavy responsibilities in the defensive zone. In the first 23 games of the season, Eichel registered 26 points, a career-high pace, while the Knights took a clear lead in the Pacific Division. His second return to Buffalo would be a much greater success than the first, scoring a hat trick and also managing an assist while leading the Golden Knights to a 7–4 victory.

International play

As a 15-year-old Eichel represented the United States at the 2012 Winter Youth Olympics. He won a bronze medal with Team USA at the 2013 World U-17 Hockey Challenge and a silver medal at the 2013 IIHF World U18 Championships. The following season he helped the USA squad capture the gold medal at the 2014 IIHF World U18 Championships, and he competed as a 17-year-old as Team USA's youngest player at the 2014 World Junior Ice Hockey Championships. Eichel represented Team USA in the 2015 World Junior Ice Hockey Championship.

At the conclusion of his freshman season with the Terriers, Eichel was named to make his full international debut with Team USA at the 2015 World Championships. Eichel scored 2 goals, including a game winner in the group stage against Slovakia, and 5 assists during the tournament, where Team USA won bronze. Eichel was selected to the 2017 Team USA IIHF World Championship roster. Team USA was eliminated in the quarter finals and placed fifth overall. Eichel recorded zero goals and five assists in eight games at the championship.

On April 19, 2019, Eichel was selected to represent Team USA at the 2019 IIHF World Championship, held in Bratislava and Kosice, Slovakia.

Career statistics

Regular season and playoffs

International

Awards and honors

References

External links

 

1996 births
Living people
AHCA Division I men's ice hockey All-Americans
American people of Canadian descent
American men's ice hockey centers
Boston University Terriers men's ice hockey players
Buffalo Sabres draft picks
Buffalo Sabres players
Chelmsford High School alumni
Hobey Baker Award winners
Ice hockey players at the 2012 Winter Youth Olympics
Ice hockey players from Massachusetts
National Hockey League All-Stars
National Hockey League first-round draft picks
USA Hockey National Team Development Program players
Vegas Golden Knights players